In physics and geometry, the troposkein  is the curve an idealized rope assumes when anchored at its ends and spun around its long axis at a constant angular velocity. This shape is similar to the shape assumed by a skipping rope, and is independent of rotational speed in the absence of gravity, but varies with respect to rotational speed in the presence of gravity.  The troposkein does not have a closed-form representation; in the absence of gravity, though, it can be approximated by a pair of line segments spanned by a circular arc (tangential to the line segments at its endpoints).  The form of a troposkein can be approximated for a given gravitational acceleration, rope density and angular velocity by iterative approximation.  This shape is also useful for decreasing the stress experienced by the blades of a Darrieus vertical axis wind turbine.

References
Ashwill, T., Leonard, T.  (1986). "Developments in Blade Shape Design for a Darrieus Vertical Axis Wind Turbine", Sandia Report, 86(1085).

Plane curves